Livera is a village and a community of the Kozani municipality. Before the 2011 local government reform it was part of the municipality of Dimitrios Ypsilantis, of which it was a municipal district. The 2011 census recorded 29 inhabitants in the community. The community of Livera covers an area of 21.978 km2.

References

Populated places in Kozani (regional unit)